Elections to Liverpool Town Council were held on Monday 1 November 1841. One third of the council seats were up for election, the term of office of each councillor being three years.

There were a total of 12,097 registered electors for the entire borough in 1841.
The census of 1841 recorded the population of the borough as 293,963 (exclusive of about 10,000 seamen). These figures revealing that only about 4% of the population were enfranchised. (Although the census figures includes children, which skews the figures to some extent).

Three of the sixteen wards were uncontested.

After the election of 16 Councillors on 1 November 1841, and the election of 8 Aldermen on 9 November 1841, the composition of the council was:

Election result

Ward results

* - Retiring Councillor seeking re-election

Abercromby

Castle Street

Everton

Exchange

Great George

Lime Street

North Toxteth

Pitt Street

Rodney Street

{{Election box candidate with party link|
  |party      = Conservative Party (UK)
  |candidate  = Henry Lawrence
  |votes      = ''345  |percentage = 56%  |change     = 
}}

St. Anne Street

St. Paul's

St. Peter's

Scotland

South Toxteth

Vauxhall

West Derby

Aldermanic Elections

On 9 November 1841, the term of office of eight of the sixteen aldermen expired.

The following were elected as Aldermen by the Council on 9 November 1841 for a term of office of six years.*''' - re-elected Alderman.

See also
Liverpool Town Council elections 1835 - 1879
Liverpool City Council elections 1880–present
Mayors and Lord Mayors 
of Liverpool 1207 to present
History of local government in England

References

1841
1841 English local elections
November 1841 events
1840s in Liverpool